National Democratic Alliance was an alliance of right wing political parties of Bangladesh.

History
National Democratic Alliance was formed in 1992 by 10 nationalist political parities and was led by Khandaker Moshtaque Ahmed. 

Khandaker Abdur Rashid, a convicted assassin of the first president of Bangladesh Sheikh Mujibur Rahman, was elected to parliament from Comilla-6 on a National Democratic Alliance nomination.

References

Nationalist parties in Asia
Political parties in Bangladesh
Political parties established in 1992
1992 establishments in Bangladesh
Organisations based in Dhaka